The San Isidro Labrador Parish Church (Spanish: Iglesia Parroquial de San Isidro Labrador), commonly known as Lazi Church, is a Roman Catholic church in the municipality of Lazi, Siquijor, Philippines within the jurisdiction of the Diocese of Dumaguete. It became an independent parish in 1857 under the advocacy of Saint Isidore the Laborer

The church, also known for its huge convent, was declared a National Cultural Treasure by the National Museum of the Philippines. It is also nominated for the UNESCO World Heritage Tentative List since 2006 under the collective group of Baroque Churches of the Philippines (Extension) together with the churches of Boljoon, Guiuan, Loboc and Tumauini. In 2014, the government announced its plan to nominate Lazi Church in the World Heritage List. It conducted a dossier training for Lazi representatives. Once the dossiers are completed, the long process of nomination will commence in Paris.

History 
Lazi (formerly Tigbawan) became an independent parish from Siquijor on August 8, 1857. The present stone church was built in 1884 by Filipino artisans followed by the bell tower in the following year. The construction of the convent was made with coral stones and hardwood, commenced in 1887 and completed in 1891. Both the church and the convent were done under the direction of Recollect priest Father Toribio Sánchez.

Architecture
The church is built of sea stones and wood. It belongs to the neoclassical style. It has two pulpits and has retained its original retablo and wood florings.

Convent
The U-shaped Bahay na bato convent is one of the largest convents built during the Spanish colonial era. On its first floor are stonewalls while wood panels can be found on the second floor. It is funded by donations from parishes and missions of the Recollects. Partitions of the convent were removed but the original structure was maintained. It now houses the Siquijor Heritage Museum which has collections of important church relics and paraphernalia.

Historical and cultural declarations 

Lazi Church was declared a National Cultural Treasure by the National Museum of the Philippines in 2001. It was also declared a  National Historical Landmark by the National Historical Commission of the Philippines in 1984. It is also nominated to be part of the UNESCO World Heritage Sites of the Philippines under the Baroque Churches of the Philippines (Extension) with the churches of Patrocinio de María in Boljoon, Cebu; La Inmaculada Concepción in Guiuan, Eastern Samar; San Pedro Ápostol in Loboc, Bohol and San Mattias in Tumauini, Isabela.

See also

Notes

Bibliography

External links

National Cultural Treasures of the Philippines
Roman Catholic churches in Siquijor
Spanish colonial infrastructure in the Philippines
National Historical Landmarks of the Philippines
Baroque architecture in the Philippines
World Heritage Tentative List for the Philippines
1857 establishments in the Spanish Empire